Ashina Zhen (also referred to as Shi Zhen 史震) — was a puppet khagan set up by Emperor Xuanzong of the Tang dynasty in China; He ruled briefly.

Life 
He was a son of Ashina Xian. In October, 735, Turkic tribe leader and warlord Suluk attacked the Beiting Protectorate. As a reaction, he was appointed as Xingxiwang Khagan to defend the Four Garrisons of Anxi and attached him to Gai Jiayun (蓋嘉運). However he was removed from this post when he was defeated in 736.

Source 

 Cefu Yuangui

8th-century Turkic people
Ashina house of the Turkic Empire
Tang dynasty generals
Göktürk khagans